George Read Riddle (1817 – March 28, 1867) was an American engineer, lawyer and politician from Wilmington, Delaware. He was a member of the Democratic Party who served as U.S. Representative and as U.S. Senator from Delaware.

Early life and family
Riddle was born in New Castle, Delaware and studied civil engineering at Delaware College, now the University of Delaware.  In addition he studied law and was admitted to the Delaware Bar in 1848, beginning a practice in Wilmington, Delaware. With his engineering background, he was named as a commissioner to retrace the Mason–Dixon line in 1849, and was otherwise engaged in the construction of railroads and canals. In 1844, Riddle was hired to design the Wilmington and Brandywine Cemetery.  During the Civil War, Riddle served with the Home Guard of Wilmington. His wife's name was Margaret.

Political career
From 1849 to 1850, Riddle served as a Deputy Attorney General of the United States. After losing in the election of 1844, he was elected to the U.S. House in 1850 and served for two terms from March 4, 1851, until March 3, 1855. During the 33rd Congress, Riddle was the Chairman of the Committee on Engraving. Running for a third term he was defeated in 1854 by Elisha D. Cullen.

In 1860, Riddle was one of only two slaveholders in Delaware. He owned three slaves, a 68-year-old male and two females aged 56 and 12.

On February 2, 1864, Riddle was elected to the United States Senate to fill the vacancy caused by the resignation of U.S. Senator James A. Bayard, Jr. He served until his death on March 29, 1867.

Death and legacy

Riddle died while in office at Washington, D.C. and is buried in the Wilmington and Brandywine Cemetery at Wilmington.

Almanac
Elections are held the first Tuesday after November 1. U.S. Representatives took office March 4 and have a two-year term. The General Assembly chose the U.S. Senators, who also took office March 4, but for a six-year term. In this case he was completing the existing term, the vacancy caused by the resignation of James A. Bayard, Jr.

See also
List of United States Congress members who died in office (1790–1899)

Notes

References

External links
Biographical Directory of the United States Congress 
Delaware’s Members of Congress
The Political Graveyard

Places with more information
Delaware Historical Society; website; 505 North Market Street, Wilmington, Delaware 19801; (302) 655-7161
University of Delaware; Library website; 181 South College Avenue, Newark, Delaware 19717; (302) 831-2965

1817 births
1867 deaths
People from New Castle, Delaware
Democratic Party members of the United States House of Representatives from Delaware
Democratic Party United States senators from Delaware
American slave owners
Delaware lawyers
People from Wilmington, Delaware
19th-century American politicians
19th-century American lawyers
University of Delaware alumni
People of Delaware in the American Civil War
Burials at Wilmington and Brandywine Cemetery
United States senators who owned slaves